Hellemans is a surname.  Notable people with the surname include:

 Alfons Hellemans (born 1939), Belgian racing cyclist
 August Hellemans (1907–1992), Belgian footballer and manager
 Greet Hellemans (born 1959), Dutch rower
 Nicolette Hellemans (born 1961), Dutch rower, sister of Greet